David Sims (born February 14, 1953) is an American sportscaster. He currently is the television play-by-play commentator for the Seattle Mariners. Sims was the 2018, 2019 and 2020 National Sports Media Association's Washington state Sportscaster of the Year. He is in his 16th season as the co-host (with Mike Krzyzewski) of Basketball and Beyond with Coach K on Sirius XM Satellite Radio. In 2009 Sims was also the television play-by-play host for the UFL on Versus.

Biography
Sims grew up in Philadelphia and attended Bethany College in West Virginia, where he played one year of varsity football, finishing third in kickoff returns in the Presidents' Athletic Conference, and catcher for the Bison baseball team (in Division III) and majored in mass communications. He began his career as a sportswriter for the New York Daily News.

In the early 1980s he was a sports reporter for the short lived "Satellite News Channel". Moving to radio, Sims became the host of WNBC's SportsNight (1986–1988) (replacing Jack Spector), a five-hour nightly sports call-in show that was a precursor to the all-sports talk format of WFAN. He was hired by Michael Weisman as a reporter covering track and field for NBC Sports' telecast of the 1988 Summer Olympics. He went on to cohost the midday show with Ed Coleman on New York's Sports Radio 66 WFAN, Sept. 1989-Feb. 1993. He then became a weekend sports anchor at WCBS-TV in New York (1995–1998) and also was a radio host for the New York Knicks (1986–1993).

Sims' play-by-play announcing career began (1990–1992) as the radio voice of Temple Owls football in the Big East. Moving to TV, Sims was the TV Voice of the Big East Conference football game of the week (1993–1994) and then again (1998–2007).

In 1991, Sims joined ESPN as a play-by-play announcer for college basketball, and added college football in 1998. He primarily called Big East contests on the ESPN Plus regional network. He continues to broadcast college basketball games for FOX and FS1 beginning in 2016.

Sims was the #2 broadcaster for NFL on Westwood One Sports's Sunday afternoon doubleheader before taking the permanent play-by-play position on Sunday Night Football. He replaced Joel Meyers on the Sunday Night Football game in 2006. Sims worked "Sunday Night Football" games from 2006 to 2012. From 2013 to 2014, Sims returned to Sunday Afternoon NFL action while working with former NFL quarterback Mark Malone.

In addition to Sunday Night Football, Sims also called college basketball for Westwood One (1998–2014) with his most notable call to date being the George Mason-UConn regional final in 2006 (where #11 seed George Mason upset top-seed Connecticut to become the second #11 seed in history to reach the Final Four).

While working in other sports, he occasionally provided Major League Baseball play-by-play for ESPN (1993–1994) and did an internet radio show for MLB.com (1999–2000). In , he took the opportunity to return to baseball full-time as part of the Seattle Mariners television broadcast. One of the few African-American broadcasters in the history of the sport, he is also perhaps the only one of that group not to have played in the major leagues. His broadcast partner is former Mariners 3B Mike Blowers.

Sims was the broadcaster on Fox on April 21, 2012, describing Philip Humber's perfect game. However, the game was broadcast in its entirety only in the Chicago and Seattle markets, because the rest of the country heard Joe Buck and Tim McCarver call a game between the New York Yankees and the Boston Red Sox. Because the game was broadcast on FOX in both markets, Sims had to call the game from a neutral standpoint as a broadcaster and not as the usual Mariners broadcaster, even though his team lost to a perfect game.

Just four months after calling Philip Humber's perfect game, Félix Hernández threw the first perfect game in Mariners' history. Sims called the game for Root Sports in Seattle. This is the first time that one broadcaster has called two perfect games in the same Major League Baseball season.

Notable catchphrases
Sims is noted for using the following catchphrases on Mariner broadcasts:
"Giddy up! Baby! Giddy up!"- used on exciting plays and also used on balls that may go over the fence for a home run.
"Bye-Bye!" - Home Run.
"Boomstick Baby!"- used whenever Nelson Cruz hit a home run.
"Holy Mackerel"/"How about that?"- used for exciting plays.
”Bro-uh-uh-uh-uh-uh-ther.” - used after a particularly dispiriting loss or play.
”Hey Now!”- used after exciting game changing plays.

Sims is a staunch believer in letting his audience know when a pitcher is working on a no-hitter. "I have to tell the audience what’s going on…if a guy’s throwing a no-no, I have to report it."

References

External links

DingoTalk interview with Carlo Guadagnino

Living people
1953 births
African-American sports journalists
American sports journalists
American radio sports announcers
American television sports announcers
Bethany College (West Virginia) alumni
Bethany Bison baseball players
Bethany Bison football players
College basketball announcers in the United States
College football announcers
Major League Baseball broadcasters
National Football League announcers
United Football League broadcasters
Television anchors from New York City
Television personalities from Philadelphia
Seattle Mariners announcers
Tampa Bay Buccaneers announcers
Temple Owls football announcers
New York Knicks announcers
National Basketball Association broadcasters
Sportswriters from New York (state)
Sportswriters from Pennsylvania
21st-century African-American people
20th-century African-American people